Dearly Beloved is the sixth studio album by American rock band Daughtry, released on September 17, 2021, through Dogtree Records. It is the follow up to Cage to Rattle (2018), and their first album not to be released by RCA Records. To promote the album, the Dearly Beloved Tour was originally scheduled to start in November 2021 and feature Sevendust and Tremonti as co-headliners. However, due to the sudden death of Chris Daughtry's step-daughter, the first shows were rescheduled.
It is the last album to feature founding bassist Josh Paul, who left the band in January 2022. 

Dearly Beloved marks the band's return to post-grunge and hard rock.

Track listing

Personnel

Daughtry
Chris Daughtry – lead vocals, third guitar
Josh Steely – lead guitar
Brian Craddock – rhythm guitar
Josh Paul – bass, backing vocals
Elvio Fernandes – keyboards, backing vocals
Brandon Maclin – drums, percussion

Additional personnel
Marti Frederiksen - producer, digital editing, programming
Brian Craddock – art direction, design 
Scott Stevens - producer, mixing, digital editing, programming
Chris Baseford - mixing
Andrew Cruz - mastering
Evan Frederiksen - engineering, digital editing
Mark Holman - additional production
Elvio Fernandes - additional production
Sinclair - backing vocals on "Call You Mine"

Charts

References

2021 albums
Daughtry (band) albums